The Rev. Thomas E. Walsh, C.S.C.  was an Irish-Canadian Catholic priest, and seventh President of the University of Notre Dame from 1881 to 1893.
He was born one of nine in Lacolle, Quebec, son of Thomas Walsh and Winifred McDermott. He was educated at the College de Saint-Laurent, where he caught the attention of Rev. Edward Sorin, who saw his potential. He finished his studies there in 1872 and entered the Novitiate. Sorin sent him to study at College de Ste. Croix in Neuilly, close to Paris, where he spent three years. 
He was recalled to Notre Dame in 1876 in order to improve enrollment. He was ordained a priest on August 29th, 1877 by Bishop Joseph Dwenger of Fort Wayne and then assumed the role of Dean of Students. After the great fire of 1879, Walsh was in charge of rescheduling classes and professors in the newly reopened college, and his administrative ability led Sorin and William Corby to pick him as next president in 1881. He died of kidney disease at the age of 40.

Walsh Hall at the University of Notre Dame was dedicated in his honor.

President of the University of Notre Dame 
As president, Walsh interest was in bolstering Notre Dame's scholastic reputation and standards. At the time, many students came to Notre Dame for its business courses only, and did not graduate. He started a "Belles Lettres" programs and invited many notable lay intellectuals to campus, including Maurice Francis Egan, and started reconstructing the library which was lost in the fire. Walsh reorganized the law school and in 1882 he built the Science Hall. He also built Sorin Hall which was the first freestanding residence hall on campus and one of the first in the country to have private rooms for students. Walsh was initially against this innovation, as he believed private rooms would lead to disciplinary issues, but this project was championed by Sorin and John Zahm. During his tenure, Notre Dame started its football program and started awarding the Laetare Medal.

References

External links

Presidents of the University of Notre Dame
20th-century Canadian Roman Catholic priests
Congregation of Holy Cross
1853 births
1893 deaths